The 1991–92 SM-liiga season was the 17th season of the SM-liiga, the top level of ice hockey in Finland. 12 teams participated in the league, and Jokerit Helsinki won the championship.

Standings

Playoffs

Quarterfinals
 Lukko - Ässät 0:2 (1:4, 0:4)
 TPS - HIFK 1:2 (1:3, 5:3, 3:4)

Semifinals
 Jokerit - Ässät 3:2 (6:2, 2:3, 6:0, 2:6, 5:0)
 JyP HT - HIFK 3:2 (5:0, 1:4, 5:1, 4:6, 3:2)

3rd place
 Ässät - HIFK 2:3

Finals
 JyP HT - Jokerit 1:4 (2:5, 1:5, 3:2, 3:4, 0:4)

External links
 SM-liiga official website

1991–92 in Finnish ice hockey
Fin
Liiga seasons